is a Japanese former Nippon Professional Baseball pitcher.

External links

1970 births
Living people
Baseball people from Aichi Prefecture
Aoyama Gakuin University alumni
Japanese baseball players
Nippon Professional Baseball pitchers
Yomiuri Giants players
Japanese baseball coaches
Nippon Professional Baseball coaches